Cincelichthys is a genus of high-bodied cichlids found in southern Mexico to Guatemala, where they inhabit lakes, rivers (typically sluggish) and other freshwater habitats.

They feed on vegetable matter, like fruits, parts of aquatic and land plants, and algae. They share their chisel-like teeth with Kihnichthys and whether they should be merged into a single genus is not yet fully resolved; a review in 2020 recommended that Kihnichthys should be moved into Cincelichthys.

Species
There are currently 2 recognized species in this genus:
 Cincelichthys bocourti (Vaillant & Pellegrin, 1902) (Chisel-tooth cichlid)
 Cincelichthys pearsei (C. L. Hubbs, 1936) (Pantano cichlid)

References

Heroini
Cichlid genera